Thady Connellan (1780–1854) was an Irish school-teacher, poet and historian.

Life
He was born in Skreen, County Sligo, and was a relative of the scholar Owen Connellan. He started a school of his own, but had more success when he became principal of a school established by Albert Blest, a Baptist, in Greenville, Coolaney, in the early 1800s. Like his relative Owen he left the Catholic church and embraced Protestantism. Among other works he produced an Irish-English dictionary and edited a series of song-books.

He died at Sligo, on 25 July 1854.

References

Attribution

1780 births
1854 deaths
Heads of schools in Ireland
Irish schoolteachers
Linguists from Ireland
People from County Sligo
17th-century Irish historians